Gwilym Davies may refer to:

 Gwilym Ednyfed Hudson Davies (1929–2018), Welsh Labour Party then SDP politician, Member of Parliament for Conway 1966–1970, Caerphilly 1979–1983
 Gwilym Elfed Davies, Baron Davies of Penrhys (1913–1992), Welsh Labour politician, Member of Parliament for Rhondda East 1959–1974
 Gwilym Davies (minister) (1879–1955), Welsh Baptist minister
 Gwilym Davies (barista) (born 1967), Winner of the 2009 World Barista Championship